, formerly spelled Hongkew, is a district of Shanghai, forming part of the northern urban core.

It is the location of the Astor House Hotel, Broadway Mansions, Lu Xun Park, and Hongkou Football Stadium. It was once known as Shanghai's "Little Tokyo"

Hongkou is home to the Shanghai International Studies University (SISU), the Shanghai University of Finance and Economics (SUFE), and the 1933 Old Millfun.

History 
During the Tang dynasty, the area in modern Hongkou District may have been a beach included in a seawall (捍海塘) near the East China Sea. In the early Ming dynasty, it became known as 黃埔口 (Huangpukou) or 洪口 (Hongkou), as there is a river mouth debouched into the Huangpu River, in the early Qing dynasty, it was renamed as 虹口 (Hongkou).

In 1845, an American bishop W. J. Boone bought an area of land there, and it later evolved into the American Concession in Shanghai in 1848 and merged into the International Concession in 1863, it was in large part reduced to rubble during the Second World war when Shanghai was occupied by the Japanese. 20,000 Ashkenazi Jewish refugees from Nazi-occupied Europe lived in an overcrowded square-mile section known to as the Shanghai Ghetto, in the Tilanqiao neighborhood of Hongkew.

In 1947, it was renamed as Hongkou District.

Subdistricts
Hongkou is responsible for the administration of the following subdistricts.

Economy

Previously Lianhua Supermarket had its Shanghai office in the district.

Schools
 Hongkou Experimental School
 Shanghai Beihong Senior High School
 Shanghai Beijiao Senior High School
 Shanghai Chengzhong Senior High School
 Shanghai Jiguang Senior High School
 Shanghai No.1 Normal Senior High School
 Shanghai Fuxing Senior High School
 Shanghai Hongkou Senior High School
 Shanghai Hainan middle school

International schools
Russian Consulate School in Shanghai is a Russian overseas primary school operated by the Russian Ministry of Foreign Affairs, located on the grounds of the Consulate-General of Russia in Shanghai in Hongkou District.

Transportation

Metro
Hongkou is currently served by five metro lines operated by Shanghai Metro:
 - Dongbaoxing Road, Hongkou Football Stadium , Chifeng Road, Dabaishu, Jiangwan Town
 - Hailun Road , Linping Road
 - Siping Road , Quyang Road, Hongkou Football Stadium 
 - North Sichuan Road, Hailun Road , Youdian Xincun, Siping Road 
 - International Cruise Terminal, Tilanqiao

References

Further reading

External links

 
Districts of Shanghai